Nalu at Fullham Correctional Centre is a minimum security correctional facility located outside the main walls of Fulham Correctional Centre in Sale, Victoria. It is a state-funded facility that is run by GEO Group Australia, which runs Fulham as well.

It is set up as a special unit for first time young offenders aged 18–25 who are at minimum security rating. The facility is made up of small cottages which house four prisoners each. They are given weekly allowances for grocery shopping and have to prepare their own meals. There are basketball courts, games facilities, and a gym. A second pre-release program at Nalu caters for all eligible inmates (regardless of age) at Fulham who are nearing release

The prisoners take part in a 16-week Challenge program, where they learn to deal with their offences in an active way. The program includes camping, trust exercises and a cognitive skills program.

External links
Police chase prison escapee, The Age, May 5, 2005

Prisons in Victoria (Australia)
Year of establishment missing
Private prisons in Australia
2004 establishments in Australia
Sale, Victoria